John R. Clarke (born November 20, 1945) is an American scientist, private pilot and author. He is currently the Scientific Director at the United States Navy Experimental Diving Unit (NEDU). Clarke is recognized as a leading authority on underwater breathing apparatus engineering.

Background
Clarke is the youngest of four children; his siblings are now deceased.

In 1969, Clarke volunteered for the United States Army Reserves. He was promoted to first lieutenant in 1974 then Captain in 1979. Clarke was honorably discharged in September 1980.

While at Georgia Tech in 1965, Clarke earned his scuba diving certification. He later participated in the NOAA/ Navy Scientist in the Sea program in 1972. He then went to the Navy Dive School in 1980. Clarke has remained an active scuba diver throughout his career.

Clarke received his private pilot license in 1974 and instrument rating in 1978. He currently owns a Piper Arrow and volunteers as a pilot for Angel Flight Southeast.

Education
Clarke graduated from Shawnee Mission East High School in Prairie Village, Kansas in 1964. He received a BS degree in applied biology (1969), and an MS degree (1971) from Georgia Tech. His master's thesis studied the impact of pressure on Sacchromyces cerevisiae.

Physiology continued to drive Clarke and in 1976 he completed his Doctor of Philosophy by evaluating changes in physiology and pharmacology in bivalve molluscs hearts at Florida State University (FSU).

Academic career
While completing his doctorate at FSU, Clarke worked as instructor and director of development in the Department of Biological and Physical Sciences at Thomas County Community College from 1975 to 1976.

Later in 1976, Clarke assumed a position as instructor and research associate in the Department of Physiology at Case Western Reserve University School of Medicine.

In 1977, Clarke left Case Western for a two–year Parker B. Francis Foundation Fellowship in the Department of Physiology at the University of Florida College of Medicine. The fellowship is named after the founder of Puritan Bennett and supports pulmonary research.

While working for the US Navy, Clarke accepted an appointment as an Adjunct Assistant Professor with Graduate Advisory Status for the Uniformed Services University of the Health Sciences from 1984 to 1990.

Clarke accepted an appointment as a Visiting Principal Fellow at the University of Wollongong in April 1998 to advise on a doctoral project. As of 2015, Clarke has served on five thesis committees from various institutions. Advisees have included Margie E. Bolton, Elizabeth Jane McCarthy, Rungchai Chaunchaiyakul, Erich C. Frandrup, and Adam J. Smith.

US Navy career
In 1979, Clarke joined the team at the Naval Medical Research Institute (NMRI), now called the Naval Medical Research Center in Bethesda, Maryland. He was the head of the Respiratory Physiology Branch of the Physiology Division in the Diving Medicine Department. When Clarke left NMRI in 1991, he was the Diving Life Support Equipment Program Director GM-14.

Clarke led a team of researchers, scientists and engineers while at NMRI. The projects included work on diving equipment and physiology that included high frequency ventilation experiments.

From 1983 to 1991, Clark served as a National Research Council mentor for PhD research fellows. Clarke also mentored students from the Research Science Institute with some students winning the nationwide Westinghouse science competition.

Since 1991, Clarke has served as the Scientific Director GM-15 at the United States Navy Experimental Diving Unit (NEDU) in Panama City, Florida.

At NEDU, Clarke provides scientific oversight over engineering and physiological studies RDT&E for US Navy diving operations. He also serves as an advisor for Naval Sea Systems Command policy regarding technical challenges. This work includes equipment evaluations and physiology experimentation.

Writing
Clarke's interest in writing began early. He published his first scientific article at age fifteen. While an undergraduate engineering student, he was paid for two of his articles in the Georgia Tech Engineer.

Clarke assisted his writing mentor, author Max McCoy, with a chapter taking place at NEDU in McCoy's 2004 book Moon Pool.

Middle Waters
In 2014, Clarke published his first novel, Middle Waters. It deals with two divers that set out to rescue aliens stranded on their spacecraft at the bottom of the sea. The government is aware of their presence and very interested in the alien technology. The divers soon find themselves caught between the alien civilization and their own government as they work to avert disaster while unknowingly competing with their friends in the recovery.

Award winning author and physician Rachel Scott suggested readers not "start this read at bedtime, if you plan to get any sleep!".

Max McCoy, author for the Indiana Jones franchise from 1995 on, claimed that Middle Waters was a book he had wished he'd written and would read over and over again. This was based partially on the fact that the main character is a diving scientist, a role that Clarke knows well and expertly conveys his knowledge to the reader.

Professional societies and service
Clarke is a member of the American Academy of Underwater Sciences, the American Physiological Society, Sigma XI, and the Undersea and Hyperbaric Medical Society (UHMS). He served as the Chair of UHMS's Membership Committee from 1989 to 1991 and was elected as a member at large to their executive committee, serving in that role from 1998 to 2001.

Clarke also serves as a reviewer for research journals including the Journal of Applied Physiology, Ergonomics, Undersea Biomedical Research, and Annals of Biomedical Engineering.

Diving safety is a passion and Clarke volunteers as an advisor to the National Association of Underwater Instructors Rebreather Advisory Committee and Florida State University Diving Control Board. Clarke also lectures to the general diving public about issues impacting diver safety.

Awards
In 1998, Clarke was selected as a Naval Sea Systems Command Spring 1998 trainee for "Leadership for a Democratic Society" course at the Office of Personnel Management's Federal Executive Institute in Charlottesville, Virginia.

Clarke won first place in the 2010 "best first line in a comic vampire novel" contest held by the Ozark Creative Writers' Conference in Eureka Springs, Arkansas.

Bibliography

Book chapters

Refereed Journals

Non-Refereed Journals and Reports

Patents
 1994 
 1996

See also

References

External links
 
 John Clarke at LinkedIn
 John Clarke at Twitter
 , hosted by the Rubicon Foundation

1945 births
Living people
People from Fort Smith, Arkansas
People from Panama City, Florida
American medical researchers
American underwater divers
Diving engineers
American inventors
Florida State University alumni
Georgia Tech alumni
Aviators from Florida
Thomas University faculty